Gothenburg City Theatre opened in 1934 at Götaplatsen square in Gothenburg, Sweden. The theatre was designed by Swedish architect Carl Bergsten who gave the exterior a Neo-Classical look with a touch of Streamline Moderne. The critics thought it to be a too old-fashioned building – the International Style had had a big breakthrough some years before at the 1930 Stockholm Exhibition. But the interiors of the building pleased the reviewers who thought the auditorium to be "intimate" and “democratic”. The theatre went through a major renovation some years ago and the auditorium was equipped with new technology and with new seats.

The big stage has a capacity of 600 people; there is also a smaller stage called the Studio.

Many of Sweden's big theatre profiles have passed the gates of the theatre: Gösta Ekman (senior) and Ingmar Bergman, just to mention two of them. And during the Second World War Torsten Hammarén made the theatre famous for its anti-Nazi productions. The current leader of the theatre is Anna Takanen and before that it was run by Bosnian-Swedish director Jasenko Selimovic, who during a ten-year period managed to please both audience and theatre critics.

Notes

External links
 Gothenburg City Theatre

City
Theatre
Theatres in Sweden
Streamline Moderne architecture
Theatres completed in 1934
1934 establishments in Sweden